Joe Foss High School is an alternative school located in Sioux Falls, South Dakota.  In September 2015, the original building was sold to a religious group for $600,000, and the classes were moved to the former building of Axtell Park Middle School. The high school is operated alongside multiple other at-risk programs in the building, such as programs for middle school students, and suspensions from other schools in the district.

References

Public high schools in South Dakota